Neolitsea cassia is a species of tree in the family Lauraceae. It is endemic to  Sri Lanka. It is known as "dawulu kurundu - දවුල් කුරුදු" or "kudu dawula - කුඩු දවුල" in Sinhala.

Trunk
Bark - thick, smooth, gray; W- light, hard, pale orange.

Ecology
Montane and rain forest understory.

Uses
Wood - panelling; leaves- mucilaginous extract used in preparation of local sweet called aasmi; bark, leaves - medicinal.

Identification
Straight stem with greyish bark and short, slender branches. The leaf flush is smooth, silvery copper, drooping, crowded at the ends of branchlets, and turn bright green when mature. Leaves are lanceolate in shape with a slightly pointed base and a tapering pointed apex, about 6–18 cm long and 1.5–4 cm broad. The three veins beginning from the base are prominent, but the lateral veins are faint on the upper surface. The petiole appears as channeled above. Pale yellow flowers are seen in small clusters borne on short branchlets on the internodes. Male and female flowers are distinguishable. The fruit is dark purple, ovoid in shape, about 1.0 cm in size with a ring-like cap at the base.

References

 http://indiabiodiversity.org/species/show/263496
 
 http://www.theplantlist.org/tpl/record/tro-50148283

cassia
Endemic flora of Sri Lanka